Herman Smith-Johannsen,  (15 June 1875 – 5 January 1987) was a Norwegian skier, credited for introducing cross-country skiing to Canada and North America. In his youth he was rated one of the best all-round Norwegian skiers. He became a supercentenarian and died at 111.

Personal life 
Johannsen was born in Horten, Norway, on 15 June 1875, the oldest of nine children. After studying in Berlin he moved to the United States before settling in Piedmont, Quebec. He married Alice Robinson (1882–1963) in 1907. They had three children; Alice (1911–1992), Robert "Bob" (1915–2001) and Peggy (1918–2014).

The family moved to Pelham, just outside New York City, in 1916. Johannsen managed a business importing heavy-equipment from Norway to North America and Cuba, shuttling between New York and Montreal, until the family permanently settled in Canada ca. 1929.

Johannsen died from pneumonia on 5 January 1987 at the age of 111 years, 204 days, near Tønsberg, Norway, being the oldest man in the world for the last 22 days of his life. He is buried by the St. Sauveur church in Saint-Sauveur, Quebec, Canada, next to his wife, who died in 1963. His archives are held at the McGill University Archives in Montreal.

Professional life
Johannsen graduated from the Norwegian Military Academy in 1894 with a commission as a lieutenant in the Norwegian Army Reserve.
In 1899 he graduated with an engineering degree from the University of Berlin. Two years later he moved to Cleveland, Ohio where he worked at selling heavy machinery. In 1907 he became an independent agent, selling heavy equipment, based out of New York City and eventually Montreal.

Sportsman
Johannsen is credited with building many ski jumps and with blazing trails throughout Ontario, the Eastern Townships, the Laurentians, and the Adirondack Mountains in New York. In 1972 he was appointed as a Member of the Order of Canada for fostering and developing skiing as a recreation and helping and encouraging generations of skiers in Canada.

Founded in 1986, the Jackrabbit Ski Trail in the Adirondacks is named in honour of Johannsen. While living and vacationing in Lake Placid between 1916 and 1928, Johannsen laid out some of the original routes used by today's trail. He was also famous for his one-day ascents of Mount Marcy (the highest mountain in New York State) starting from Lake Placid, a round-trip of over 30 miles.

Johannsen is also the namesake of Cross Country Canada's Jackrabbit program designed to introduce children 6–9 to cross-country skiing through local ski clubs. Some former "Jackrabbits" introduced to skiing through the program include Olympic medallists Beckie Scott, Sara Renner, and Chandra Crawford and World Champions Devon Kershaw and Alex Harvey.

In 1968, Johannsen received an honorary doctorate from Sir George Williams University, which later became Concordia University. In 1969 he was inducted to the National Ski Hall of Fame. He was profiled during ABC Sports coverage of the 1984 Winter Olympic Games. He was an honorary member of the Norwegian skiing and gentlemen's club SK Ull.

References

Further reading
 Johannsen, Alice E.(1993). The Legendary Jackrabbit Johannsen. McGill-Queens University Press.  
 Powell, Brian et al. (1975). Jackrabbit His First Hundred Years. Collier Macmillan Canada, Ltd.
 Norton, Phillip. "Jackrabbit Johannsen. The Pioneer of Skiing in Canada". Canadian Geographic Magazine, Apr/May-1987:18-23.
 Møller, Arvid(1980). (in Norwegian) Høvding Herman : fortellingen om Herman Smith-Johannsen (Chief Herman: tales about Herman Smith-Johannsen). Aschehoug, Oslo,

External links
 Cross Country Canada
 Laurentian Heritage
 Documentary dedicated to Herman Smith Johannsen, by William Brind, 1975
 Herman Jackrabbit Smith-Johannsen Fonds. McGill University Library & Archives

1875 births
1987 deaths
Norwegian male cross-country skiers
Canadian male cross-country skiers
Norwegian centenarians
Canadian supercentenarians
Men supercentenarians
Deaths from pneumonia in Norway
Humboldt University of Berlin alumni
Members of the Order of Canada
Norwegian emigrants to Canada
People from Horten
SK Ull members
Sportspeople from Vestfold og Telemark